The 1942 Camp Davis Fighting AA's football team represented Camp Davis during the 1942 college football season. The Fighting AA's compiled a 4–3–2 record, outscored their opponents by a total of 119 to 104 , and shut out three opponents.  They would be ranked No. 16 in the Associated Press post-season poll for service academies.

Schedule

References

 
Camp Davis
Camp Davis Fighting AA's football